Darrell G. Bolz (born July 24, 1943, in Ontario, Oregon) was a Republican Idaho State Representative from 2001 to 2014 representing District 10 in the B seat.

Education
Bolz graduated from Fruitland High School, and earned his bachelor's degree in agriculture education from the University of Idaho. After serving three years as a sailor in the United States Navy, Bolz returned to the University of Idaho and completed his master's degree there.

Elections
2012 Unopposed for the May 15, 2012, Republican primary, Bolz won with 2,584 votes, facing Democratic nominee Angel Zeimantz for the general election on November 6, 2012.
2000 Bolz challenged incumbent Republican Representative Dorothy Reynolds in the May 23, 2000, Republican primary, winning with 1,973 votes (53.3%), and was unopposed for the November 7, 2000, general election, winning with 6,698 votes.
2002 Unopposed for the May 28, 2002, Republican primary, Bolz won with 3,262 votes, and was unopposed for the November 5, 2002, general election, winning with 7,276 votes.
2004 Unopposed for the May 25, 2004, Republican primary, Bolz won with 3,432 votes, and was unopposed for the November 2, 2004, general election, winning with 9,298 votes.
2006 Unopposed for the May 23, 2006, Republican primary, Bolz won with 3,306 votes, and won the November 7, 2006, general election with 6,001 votes (66.27%) against Darlene Madsen (D).
2008 Unopposed for the May 27, 2008, Republican primary, Bolz won with 3,306 votes, and was unopposed for the November 4, 2008 general election, winning with 11,382 votes.
2010 Bolz won the May 25, 2010, Republican primary with 2,658 votes (74.0%) against Kent Marmon, and was unopposed for the November 2, 2010, general election, winning with 8,280 votes.

References

External links
Darrell Bolz at the Idaho Legislature
 

1943 births
Living people
Republican Party members of the Idaho House of Representatives
People from Caldwell, Idaho
People from Ontario, Oregon
Military personnel from Idaho
University of Idaho alumni
University of Idaho faculty
United States Navy sailors